Sextuplets is a 2019 American comedy film directed by Michael Tiddes from a screenplay by Mike Glock, Rick Alvarez and Marlon Wayans. It stars Marlon Wayans and Bresha Webb, and follows a man who sets out to find his long-lost siblings after discovering he is one of sextuplets his mother had. The film was digitally released on Netflix on August 16, 2019.

Plot
An expectant father seeks his birth mother and discovers he has five other siblings born from the same pregnancy. He tries to track them down before his baby is born. He first meets with his brother Russell and the pair go on a road trip to find their other siblings. Dawn is a stripper serving time in a women's prison, Ethan is a hustler who dresses and talks like a '70s pimp, while Jasper is marked for his red hair and lighter complexion, and "Baby Pete" suffers from polio.

Cast
 Marlon Wayans as Alan Spellman Daniels / Russell Spellman / Dawn Spellman / Jasper Spellman / Ethan Spellman / Baby Pete Spellman / Lynette Spellman
 Spiral Jackson as Russell (body double)
 Bresha Webb as Marie Daniels
 Molly Shannon as Linda
 Glynn Turman as Leland
 Michael Ian Black as Doug
 Debbi Morgan as Janet
 Grace Junot as Dr. Greenberg
 Robert Pralgo as Dr. Theodore Williams
 Jason Graham as Dr. Ellis
 Jwaundace Candece as Female Guard #2

Production
In August 2018, it was announced that Marlon Wayans would star in Sextuplets. In October 2018, Molly Shannon, Glynn Turman, Michael Ian Black, and Debbi Morgan joined the cast.

Reception
The website's critical consensus reads, "Lazy, messy, and deeply unfunny, Sextuplets is the latest misfire from the collaborative duo of Marlon Wayans and Michael Tiddes." On Metacritic, it has a weighted average score of 21 out of 100, based on 5 critics, indicating "generally unfavorable reviews".

References

External links

English-language Netflix original films
Films scored by John Debney
Films directed by Michael Tiddes
2010s English-language films